The 1916 Minnesota gubernatorial election took place on November 7, 1916. Republican Party of Minnesota candidate J. A. A. Burnquist defeated Democratic Party of Minnesota challenger Thomas P. Dwyer.

Republican primary

Candidates

Nominated 

 Joseph. A. A. Burnquist, incumbent Governor, former Lieutenant Governor, former State Representative

Eliminated in primary 

 Samuel G. Iverson, former State Auditor, former State Representative

Results

Democratic primary

Candidates

Nominated 

 Thomas P. Dwyer, boilermaker

Eliminated in primary 

 Cyrus M. King, chairman of Itasca County Board of Commissioners
 Sam D. Works, State Insurance Commissioner

Results

Results

See also
 List of Minnesota gubernatorial elections

References

External links
 http://www.sos.state.mn.us/home/index.asp?page=653
 http://www.sos.state.mn.us/home/index.asp?page=657

Minnesota
Gubernatorial
1916
November 1916 events